Entwurf eines Cannabiskontrollgesetzes (CannKG; "Draft of a cannabis control law") was a bill proposed in 2015 that would remove cannabis from the list of scheduled drugs in Betäubungsmittelgesetz, the federal controlled substances law in Germany. The issue was proposed by Alliance 90/The Greens (the German Green Party). It would regulate cannabis in a manner similar to alcohol, with adults 18 years old permitted to buy and possess up to 30 grams in regulated stores.

See also 

 Outline of cannabis
 Cannabis Act
 Deutscher Hanfverband
 Hanfparade

References

Further reading
 at Bundestag Wahlperiode 18 (18th German parliament)

Alliance 90/The Greens
Cannabis in Germany
Proposed laws